Iulian Boiko (born 22 September 2005 in Kyiv, Ukraine) is a Ukrainian snooker player who was professional from 2020 to 2022.

Career 
In May 2019, Boiko registered his first official century break in a 4–3 defeat against Billy Joe Castle in the Q School 2019 - Event 2.

In January 2020, Boiko finished as runner-up in the WSF Open, as a result, he was awarded a two-year card on the World Snooker Tour for the 2020–21 and 2021–22. As a 14 years old, he became the youngest ever professional player. In March 2020, Boiko defeated Darren Morgan, a former professional player, by 5–3 in the final to become the EBSA European 6-Reds champion for the first time. Later in 2020, he participated at the qualifying stages of the World Championship, the youngest player to do so, but he was eliminated by Thor Chuan Leong in the first qualifying round, losing 6–3.

On 4 March 2021, Boiko won his first professional match in Gibraltar Open against Fergal O'Brien, winning 4–3.

Performance and rankings timeline

Career finals

Amateur finals: 3 (1 title)

Personal life 
Boiko is the son of Serhii Boiko, who is responsible for creating and overseeing the Ukrainian Snooker Federation.

References

External links 
 

2005 births
Living people
Ukrainian snooker players